Holograf is a modern rock  band from Romania. Since the band's formation in 1978, Holograf released 18 albums. The band won the Excellence Prize at Romanian Media Music Awards in 2013, the awards for best pop-rock artist and best pop-rock song at Radio Romania Music Awards Gala in 2014 and was nominated multiple times at Romanian Music Awards for Best Group and for Best Song.

History 
It was founded in 1978 by Mihai Pocorschi (guitar, voice), Eugen Sonia (bass guitar), Cristian Lesciuc (solo guitar) and Boris Petroff (drums). In 1979 Edi Petroșel (drums) și Tino Furtună (keyboards)  joined and are still part of the band. The band received awards at Club A Festival and at other festivals, which helped the band getting signed with Electrecord, the biggest Romanian label at that time, and launched Holograf 1 in 1983. In 1988 Holograf releases Holograf III, which was sold in over 200.000 copies. Holograf continued making music through the 1980s and 1990s, when it toured abroad in countries like Bulgaria, USSR, East Germany, Poland, North Korea and the Netherlands. In April 1990 Holograf performed at the Printemps de Bourges Festival. It released few new works into the new millennium, including the album "Pur si simplu" (2003). Since 1985, the lead singer of the band is Dan Bittman.

The band is known for hits like Banii vorbesc, Dincolo de nori (which Dan Bittman also sang at Eurovision Song Contest 1994), Ți-am dat un inel, Undeva departe, Să nu-mi iei niciodată dragostea, Viața are gust or Cât de departe.
In November 2000, Holograf launched Holografica, which was sold in over 100,000 copies in the first two weeks. In 2003 the band launched Pur și simplu, album which was sold in over 250.000 copies, and received gold and platinum certification. In order to promote Pur și simplu, Holograf started touring in Romania for fifty days. On October 10, 2006, Holograf released a new album called "Taina". The disc contains 10 new songs, and the first single to be promoted from the album is called "Ești atât de frumoasă" (You are so beautiful). On July 10, 2009, Holograf received a Gold certification from UPFR for record sales of the "Primăvara începe cu tine" album. Holograf performed at five editions of the Golden Stag Festival, in 1993, 1997, 2001, 2005 and 2009, and multiple times at the Mamaia Festival since 1987 and Callatis Festival.

The Holograf song "Cât de departe", was broadcast most often on Romanian radio stations, between 2010 and 2015.

Members 
 Mihai Pocorschi – guitar, lead vocals, backing vocals (1977–1986)
 Ștefan Rădescu – lead vocals (1977–1982)
 Eugen Sonia – bass (1977–1981)
 Cristian Lesciuc – guitar (1977–1978)
 Dan Ionescu – guitar (1977–1978)
 Lucian Rusu – drums (1977)
 Ionel 'Boris' Petrov – drums (1977–1978)
 Emilian 'Edi' Petroșel – drums, backing vocals (1978–present)
 Cornel Stănescu – guitar, backing vocals (1978–1982)
 Antoniu 'Tino' Furtună – keyboards, piano, backing vocals (1978–present)
 George 'Gică' Petrineanu – bass (1981–1982, 1984)
 Nikos Temistocle – bass (1983–1984)
 Sorin Ciobanu – guitar (1983–1984)
 Gabriel Cotabiță – lead vocals (1983–1985)
 Mihai 'Marty' Popescu – bass (1984–1987)
 Dan Bittman – lead vocals (1985–present)
 Ion 'Nuțu' Olteanu – guitar, backing vocals (1986–1990)
 Iulian 'Mugurel' Vrabete – bass, backing vocals (1987–present)
 Florin Ochescu – guitar (1990–1993)
 Romeo Dediu – guitar, backing vocals (1993–present)
 Marius Bațu – acoustic guitar, backing vocals (collaborator 1996–present)
 Emil Soumah – percussion, harmonica (collaborator 2000–present)
 Mihai Coman – keyboards, guitar, backing vocals, sound (collaborator 2001–2017)

Discography

Studio albums 
 Holograf 1 (LP, Electrecord, 1983)
 Holograf 2 (LP/MC, Electrecord, 1987)
 Holograf III (LP/MC, Electrecord, 1988)
 Holograf IV (Maxi-single, Electrecord, 1989)
 Banii vorbesc (LP/MC, Electrecord, 1991)
 World Full of Lies (CD, Capitan Records Company, 1993; reissued in 2013)
 Stai în poala mea (LP/CD/MC, Electrecord, 1995)
 Supersonic (CD/MC, MediaPro Music, 1998; reissued in 2000)
 Holografica (CD/MC, MediaPro Music, 2000)
 Pur și simplu (CD/MC, Holograf Production & Roton, 2003; reissued in 2013)
 Taina (CD/MC, Holograf Production & Roton, 2006; reissued in 2013)
 Love Affair (CD, MediaPro Music, 2012)
 Life Line (CD/LP, MediaPro Music & Universal Music România, 2015)

Live albums 
 69% Unplugged – Live (CD/MC, Zone Records, 1996; reissued in 2001)
 Live – Vinarte (promo CD, Holograf Production & Vinarte, 2005)
 Patria Unplugged (CD, MediaPro Music, 2011)

Singles and maxi-singles 
 Holograf Patru (maxi-single, Electrecord, 1990)
 World Full of Lies (single, Electrecord, 1991)
 Viața are gust (promo single, MediaPro Music & Coca-Cola, 2001)
 Pierd înălțimea din ochii tăi (single, MediaPro Music, 2019)
 N-ai de ce să pleci (single, MediaPro Music, 2020)
 Cum bate inima ta (single, MediaPro Music, 2021)

Compilations 
 Undeva departe (CD/MC, MediaPro Music, 1999; reissued in 2000)
 Best of Holograf – Dimineață în altă viață (CD/MC, MediaPro Music, 2002)
 Balade (promo CD, Roton & City Park, 2008)
 Primăvara începe cu tine (CD, MediaPro Music, 2009)
 Muzică de colecție, Vol. 104 (2xCD, Jurnalul Național, 2009)
 Fericirea începe acasă! (promo CD, MediaPro Music & Millennium Bank, 2010)

Video albums 
 O noapte cu Holograf (DVD, Holograf Production, 2004; reissued in 2013)
 Pur și simplu (DVD, Holograf Production, 2004)
 Concert Taina (DVD, Holograf Production & Roton, 2009)
 Patria Unplugged (DVD, MediaPro Music, 2011)

Other releases 
 Formații de muzică pop 3 (LP, Electrecord, 1979) – collective album, the track "Lungul drum al zilei către noapte"
 Dincolo de nori (maxi-single, Metro Records România, 1994) – released as a solo album by Dan Bittman

Books 
 Carmen Olaru – Holograf: Să nu-mi iei niciodată dragostea... (Nemira, Bucharest, 2002)

Awards and nominations 

 Excellence Prize at Romanian Media Music Awards in 2013.
 Best pop-rock artist and best pop-rock song at Radio Romania Music Awards Gala in 2014 for "Morning dew"
 Nomination for Romanian Music Award for Best Rock and Best Group 2014 for Holograf ft Antonia – Intoarce-te acasa

References

External links

 Official band site
 Holograf at Discogs

Romanian rock music groups